John Godwin (by 1507 – 1556 or later) of Wells, Somerset, was an English politician.

He was a Member (MP) of the Parliament of England for Wells in 1539 and October 1553.

References

16th-century deaths
People from Wells, Somerset
English MPs 1539–1540
English MPs 1553 (Mary I)
Year of birth uncertain